Hyalorista imitans is a moth in the family Crambidae. It was described by Warren in 1892. It is found in Brazil (São Paulo).

References

Moths described in 1892
Pyraustinae